Stromelysin 2 (matrix metalloproteinase 10, transin 2, proteoglycanase 2) is an enzyme. This enzyme catalyses the following chemical reaction

 Similar to stromelysin 1, but action on collagen types III, IV and V is weak

This enzyme belongs to the peptidase family M10 (interstitial collagenase family).

References

External links 
 

EC 3.4.24